The 1941 Western Kentucky State Teachers Hilltoppers football team represented Western Kentucky State Teachers College (now known as Western Kentucky University) as a member of the Southern Intercollegiate Athletic Association (SIAA) during the 1941 college football season. Led by Gander Terry in his fourth and final season as head coach, the Hilltoppers compiled an overall record of 4–5–1 with a mark of 3–1–1 in conference play.

Schedule

References

Western Kentucky State Teachers
Western Kentucky Hilltoppers football seasons
Western Kentucky State Teachers Hilltoppers football